ROKS or variant may refer to:
 Republic of Korea Ship, see Republic of Korea Navy
 ROKS flamethrowers
 Roks, or Rakúsy, a town in Slovakia
 Roks, a radio station in Belarus, see List of radio stations in Belarus
 Roks, a radio station in Ukraine, see List of radio stations in Ukraine
 National Organisation for Women's Shelters and Young Women's Shelters in Sweden

See also
 Rok (disambiguation)
 ROCS (disambiguation)
 Roques (disambiguation)

Radio stations in Ukraine